Ossé is a former commune in the Ille-et-Vilaine department in Brittany in northwestern France. On 1 January 2017, it was merged into the commune Châteaugiron.

Population
Inhabitants of Ossé are called Osséens in French.

See also
Communes of the Ille-et-Vilaine department

References

Former communes of Ille-et-Vilaine